The Albanian Basketball League for women is a league competition featuring professional basketball clubs from Albania. It was founded in 1946 from the Albanian Basketball Association, several days after the latter was formed. It is the top level basketball league in Albanian from its foundation. The team with the most championships is BC Tirana with 41 championships.

The Albanian Basketball League consists of 12 professional basketball clubs in Albania and it is one of the oldest basketball competitions in the Balkans having started in 1946. The sport rapidly grew in Albania and by the 1970s almost every city and town had its own basketball club and basketball field. After communism fell many of the basketball clubs folded as many players left the country to play for foreign teams. The basketball attendance decreased and the popularity of this sport declined worryingly. However, after 1993 basketball rose up again with many cities re-establishing their teams. Now in Albania there are twelve professional teams while there are plenty of amateur teams ready to enter the league.

History

The Albanian Basketball League is the one of the oldest continuing basketball competitions in the region of the Balkans, having started in 1946. The league was formed less than two years after the Communist Party of Albania gained control of the country, and the sport gradually grew in popularity over the years before experiencing a rapid rise in popularity in the 1970s, leading to most cities and towns in Albania forming their own basketball clubs and building basketball grounds. Following the fall of communism in 1991 many basketball clubs were forced to fold due to lack of any investment, which led to the decline in the popularity of the sport as a whole in the country. However, since 1993 there has been some re-establishment of the folded teams as private investment along with some state funded has allowed teams to continue functioning.

Competition
The members of the Albanian Basketball League are grouped in two divisions:  A1 League and B2 League. Each division has six teams and they have to play four times against each other in two different phases during the regular season. In every phase a club plays each of the others twice, once at their home stadium and once at that of their opponents. This makes a total of 20 games played per season in the regular season.

After the regular season ends the top four clubs qualify for the play-offs, where the team placed first faces the one placed fourth while the second and the third placed teams play each other. From these encounters qualifies the team that gets first two victories while games are played once home, once away until the two victories are reached. The teams that win their encounters qualify for the finals which are played in the clubs respective grounds, the game will once be played home and once away, depending on the draw. The team that gets first the three victories is crowned as champion.

Clubs that win get two points that the ones that lose get one point. At the end of the regular season the bottom two clubs miss the play-offs. The bottom club gets relegated while the fifth placed club will play the second placed of the B2 League. The team that wins the play-out has the right to play in A1 League.

Winners

Championship winning teams

References

Also look
 Albanian Basketball Cup (Women)
 Albanian Basketball Supercup (Women)

Women
Albania
Sports leagues established in 1946
Basketball
1946 establishments in Albania
league